The Old New England Building in the Library District of Downtown Kansas City, Missouri, located at 112 West 9th Street, was built in 1886 as the offices of the New England Safe Deposit and Trust Company. It was listed on the National Register of Historic Places in 1973.

References

Renaissance Revival architecture in Missouri
Commercial buildings completed in 1886
Buildings and structures in Kansas City, Missouri
Commercial buildings on the National Register of Historic Places in Missouri
National Register of Historic Places in Kansas City, Missouri
Library District (Kansas City, Missouri)